The Four Continents Figure Skating Championships (4CC) is an annual figure skating competition. The International Skating Union established it in 1999 to provide skaters representing non-European countries with a similar competition to the much older European Figure Skating Championships. The event's name refers to the Americas (North America and South America), Africa, Asia and Oceania (four of the five continents represented in the Olympic rings, omitting Europe). Medals are awarded in the disciplines of men's singles, women's singles, pairs, and ice dance.

Historically, the 4CC has been dominated by just four countries – the United States, Japan, Canada, and China – which have won a combined 277 out of 288 possible medals. South Korea (7), Kazakhstan (2), North Korea (1), and Uzbekistan (1) are the only other countries to have earned Four Continents medals.

Qualifying
Skaters must belong to a non-European member nation of the ISU. Each member country may enter up to three skaters or teams in each discipline, provided they obtain the minimum TES in the current or previous season. National governing bodies select their entries according to their own criteria. As with the other senior ISU Championships, eligible skaters must be at least seventeen before July 1 of the previous year.

As of 2018 Championships, the following countries are eligible to send skaters to the competition: Argentina, Australia, Brazil, Cambodia, Canada, China, Chinese Taipei, North Korea, Hong Kong, India, Indonesia, Japan, Kazakhstan, Kyrgyzstan, Malaysia, Mexico, Mongolia, New Zealand, Philippines, Singapore, South Africa, South Korea, Thailand, United Arab Emirates, the United States, and Uzbekistan.

Medalists

Men

Women

Pairs

Ice dance

Cumulative medal count

References

Sources

External links

 International Skating Union

 
Figure skating competitions